Vicente Gerbasi (June 2, 1913 in Canaobo, Carabobo – December 28, 1992 in Caracas) was a representative poet of Venezuelan 20th century.

Biography 
Vicente Gerbasi was born in Canoabo, a small city in Carabobo in Northern Venezuela as child of Italian immigrants. He was part of the "Grupo Viernes", and published many books of poetry; in later years, many were published by Monte Ávila Editores.

Gerbasi was also ambassador of Venezuela for many years: Haiti (1959), Israel (1960–1964), Denmark and Norway, Poland (1969–1971).

He received an honorary doctorate from the University of Carabobo in 1984. In 1986 Biblioteca Ayacucho published his Obra Poética.

Works 
Vigilia del náufrago, 1937
Bosque doliente, 1940
Liras, 1943
Poemas de la noche y de la tierra, 1943
Mi padre, el inmigrante, 1945
Tres nocturnos, 1947
Poemas, 1947
Los espacios cálidos, 1952
Círculos del trueno, 1953
La rama del relámpago, 1953
Tirano de sombra y fuego, 1955
Por arte del sol, 1958
Olivos de eternidad, 1961
Retumba como un sótano del cielo, 1977
Edades perdidas, 1981
Los colores ocultos, 1985
Un día muy distante, 1987
El solitario viento de las hojas, 1990
Iniciación a la intemperie, 1990

References

External links 
Vicente Gerbasi in Spanish
About the author (in Spanish)

Venezuelan male poets
People from Carabobo
1913 births
1992 deaths
20th-century Venezuelan poets
20th-century male writers